LagosPhoto Festival is the first international art festival of photography in Nigeria, launched in October 2010. It is organised by the African Artists’ Foundation (AAF) as part of an ongoing project designed to use art in public spaces, as a medium for increasing societal awareness. The festival includes workshops and classes for professional artists, art fairs and indoor and outdoor exhibitions citywide. LagosPhoto is held annually and features emerging photographers alongside established photographers.

Azu Nwagbogu is the festival's founder and director.

Editions

No Judgement: Africa Under the Prism (2010) 
The inaugural edition leveraged on Nigeria's 50 years of Independence. Interested participants were required to have worked in Lagos, Nigeria or in Africa shooting works that interpreted the theme.

Exhibiting photographers

Artistic Directors and Curators: Azu Nwagbogu, Caline Chagoury, Marc Prust

Architect: Kunlé Adeyemi

What’s Next Africa? The Hidden Stories (2011) 
This edition was targeted at representing the hidden stories on the continent as opposed to the mis-represented, over represented, sensationalized and dramatically images commonly covered with the power of photography.

Exhibiting photographers

Artistic Directors and Curators: Azu Nwagbogu, Caline Chagoury, Marc Prust, Medina Dugger

Seven Days in the Life of Lagos (2012) 
This edition was aimed at capturing the energy and vibrancy that make Lagos such a unique cultural environment. A city of extreme contradictions, Lagos transforms with the fast pace of urban migration and the explosion of development and technology that is dissolving barriers and leading to new types of interaction.

Exhibiting photographers

Artistic Directors and Curators: Azu Nwagbogu, Caline Chagoury, Stanley Greene, Medina Dugger and Joseph Gergel.

The Mega City and the Non-City (2013) 
This year's theme, The Megacity and the Non-City, explores how the development of urban centers in Africa and the technical advance of photography have transformed our sense of place in a globally connected world. 
The 21st century has been characterised by the rise of the megacity, with cities such as Lagos transitioning and adapting to vast changes taking place at an unprecedented speed. Urban development, population explosion, environmental changes, socio-economic gaps, and the rising middle class in metropolitan centers in Africa redefine the structure of the city as it continuously evolves. At the same time, the digital revolution transforms the spatial perimeters of an individual's immediate environment, tied to the virtual connectivity between places through expanded technologies. This concept of the “non-city” is defined by displacement, fantasy, and an unstable sense of identity, where individuals reference multifarious cross-sections of cultures. The artists presented in The Megacity and the Non-City adopt photographic practices and image-based strategies to negotiate the expanding urban landscape of Africa today, with its contradictions, grey areas, and sites of dispute. By situating photography at the core of their practice, these artists investigate the circulation of images in our society, their mass consumption and capacity to document personal and collective world-views.

Exhibiting photographers

Staging Reality, Documenting Fiction (2014) 
This year's theme, Staging Reality, Documenting Fiction, examines contemporary photographers working in Africa who negotiate the boundaries and relationships between photography, beliefs, and truths. Incorporating conceptual and performative strategies that expand traditional photographic practice, many contemporary artists working on the continent move beyond the confines of the photojournalistic gaze. These artists produce work that considers the complex social and political concerns that define a new Africa in the twenty-first century, and they explore how the ubiquity of images plays a vital role in how reality is constructed and articulated. Utilizing genres such as staged narratives, performance, appropriation, self-portraiture, and still life, these artists push the temporal and spatial boundaries of the photographic medium. In doing so, Staging Reality, Documenting Fiction considers how these artists imagine different futures and charter fictive worlds, using photography as a catalyst to investigate the changing realities of Africa today.

Exhibiting photographers
{{col-list|colwidth=22em|
Laurence Aëgerter, Tristes Tropiques: Illustrations hors texte (France)
Ade Adekola, Egungun (Nigeria)
Leonce Raphel Agbodjelou, Camouflage (Benin)
Jenevieve Aken, The Masked Woman (Nigeria)
Seun Akisanmi, Nigerian Punishments (Nigeria)
Aisha Augie-Kuta, Material Culture (Nigeria)
Ricardo Cases, El Blanco (Spain)
Edson Chagas, Oikonomos (Angola)
Kudzanai Chiurai, State of the Nation (Zimbabwe)
Pierre-Christophe Gam, The Affogbolos (France/Cameroon)
Angélica Dass, Humanae (Brazil/Spain)
Cristina de Middel, This is What Hatred Did (Spain)
Adama Delphine Fawundu, Deconstructing SHE (USA/Sierra Leone)
Glenna Gordon, Sin is a Puppy that Follows you Home: Romance Novelists in Northern Nigeria (USA)
Hassan Hajjaj, Just Do it in Blue, Y Bandana Vein in Green (Morocco)
Jacqueline Hassink, The Table of Power 2 (Netherlands)
Nicolas Henry, Tales Around the World (France)
Jan Hoek – New Ways of Photographing the New Massai (Netherlands)
Sam Hopkins, Out of Africa (Kenya)
Namsa Leuba, Cocktail (Switzerland/Guinea)
Lowe Cape Town, Cape Times “Selfies” (South Africa)
Thomas Mailaender, Cathedral Cars (France)
Dillon Marsh, Invasive Species (South Africa)
Jide Odukoya, Turn It Up! (Nigeria)
Abraham Oghobase, Untitled (Nigeria)
Karl Ohiri & Riikka Kassinen, Medicine Man: I’ll Take Care of You (UK/Finland)
Bayo Omoboriowo, Red Gold (Nigeria)
Zak Ové, A Land So Far (UK/Trinidad )
Augustin Rebetez, Arrière-tête (mécanismes) (Switzerland)
Viviane Sassen, Umbra chapter, Axiom (Netherlands)
Mary Sibande, Long Live the Dead Queen (South Africa)
Anoek Steketee & Eefje Blankevoort, Love Radio (Netherlands)
Sésu Tilley-Gyado, Afristoria: Time Reimagined (Nigeria)
Benedicte Vanderreydt, I am 14 (Belgium)
Karine Versluis, One Day I’m Gonna Make it (Netherlands)
Lorenzo Vitturi, Dalston Anatomy (Italy)
Patrick Willocq, I am Walé, Respect Me (France)
Hans Wilschut, ''Lagos (Iyana Ipaja) (The Netherlands)
}}

Designing Futures (sixth, 2015)
The guest curator was Cristina de Middel.Exhibiting photographersInherent Risk; Rituals and Performance (seventh, 2016)Exhibiting photographersRegimes of Truth (eighth, 2017)
Curated by Azu Nwagbogu.Exhibiting photographers'''

Special programmes

Etisalat Photography Competition 
Launched during LagosPhoto 2012, the Etisalat Photography Competition aims to develop and nurture photographic talent in Nigeria by providing a platform for emerging Nigerian photographers to have their work exhibited to a wide audience and win monetary prizes. The Etisalat Photography Competition utilises multiple web-based platforms and social media outlets making it easier for the public to participate. Three winners will be announced during the Grand Opening of LagosPhoto.

Future Cities Laboratory 
Mapping Workshop: Future Cities Laboratory, a Ph.D research project on comparative megacities based in Singapore, will present their research on Lagos during the festival through an interactive mapping workshop led by Lindsay Sawyer.

FOTObook 
LagosPhoto 2013 inaugurated the FOTObook project, an international exchange program between art book designers and emerging Nigerian artists that allows for an intensive study into the specialised domain of art book design and publication. Internationally acclaimed photography book designer Teun van der Heijden lead a master workshop for the FOTObook project, along with workshop facilitators Andrea Stultiens, Hans Wilschut, Cristina de Middel, and Claudia Hinterseer. FOTObook is supported by the Mondriaan Fund.

LagosPhoto Outdoor Exhibition 
These outdoor exhibitions, featured in parks and roundabouts throughout Lagos, include large scale, durable outdoor prints, featuring the iconic works of LagosPhoto present and past. The maze-like exhibitions allow for communal viewing while embracing public space, bringing photography to the center of Lagos street culture.

LagosPhoto Projects: Makoko 
As part of LagosPhoto 2012, LagosPhoto Projects launched with a trip to Makoko to document the demolition of Lagos’ most notorious slum. A group of twelve local and international photographers, videographers, and journalists traveled together to the heart of the village's ongoing destruction. As part of LagosPhoto 2012's theme "Seven Days in the Life of Lagos", LagosPhoto Projects was created to react to urgent social events that are changing the cultural landscape in Nigeria. LagosPhoto Projects consists of excursions with emerging and established photographers and journalists to document as a group the very essence that makes the city such a unique place.

LagosPhoto Summer School 
LagosPhoto Summer School, in partnership with the Neue Schule für Fotografie in Berlin, Germany, offered an international exchange with workshops in Berlin and Lagos culminating in an exhibition during the LagosPhoto festival and forthcoming book publication. The LagosPhoto Summer School is organised by Eva Maria Ocherbauer in association with LagosPhoto.

Master Class Exhibition 
Workshop with Akinbode Akibiyi: Goethe-Institut Nigeria will present an exhibition featuring works produced during a photography workshop facilitated by Berlin-based Nigerian photographer and curator Akinbode Akinbiyi at Lagos City Hall.

Photographer’s Portfolio Meeting 
The Photographers’ Portfolio Meeting, initiated by Simon Njami and the Goethe-Institut South Africa, are held once a year in different cities on the continent, where a select group of photographers meet and discuss their work leading curators and art professionals. The Photographer's Portfolio Meeting in 2013 was held in Lagos in partnership with LagosPhoto.

POPCAP '13 
POPCAP ’13, the international photography competition for contemporary African photography, has partnered with LagosPhoto to present its exhibition in Lagos during the festival. This year's winners --- Anhua Collective, Dillon Marsh, Cristina de Middel, Alexia Webster, and Graeme Williams--- executed photographic projects taken on the African continent or that deal with the African diaspora. The POPCAP ’13 exhibition was presented at Münsterplatz in Basel, Switzerland and at the PhotoIreland Festival earlier that year.

TNI.ACP Exhibition 
Workshop with Uche Okpa-Iroha: The Nlele Institut - African Centre of Photography (TNI.ACP), an arts center in Lagos with a focus on photography and lens based media, will present an exhibition of its recent workshop with founder and photographer Uche Okpa-Iroha in Lagos.

Witness Exhibition 
Workshop with Sammy Bolaji: Goethe-Institut South Africa will bring its traveling exhibition, Witness, to be shown alongside the festival. Witness presents the work produced in a photography workshop led by Sammy Bolaji, that has traveled to Bamako (Mali), Maputo (Mozambique), Abidjan (Ivory Coast), Addis Aba (Ethiopia), Douala (Cameroon), and Kampala (Uganda). Participating artists include Sammy Bolaji, Calvin Dondo, Sabelo Mlangeni, Abraham Oghobase, Monique Pelser, and Michael Tsegaye.

Workshops and artist talks 
In addition to the LagosPhoto special projects, a comprehensive programme of studio workshops and panel discussions will take place throughout the duration of the festival. The LagosPhoto Workshop Program provides opportunities for emerging photographers to further their education in the many different facets of photography taught by leading international photographers. Past workshops have included beginning courses on camera operation, advanced lighting courses and digital post-production courses, project workshops where photographers collaborate and produce work in the field, self-portraiture courses, and studio tutorials.

World Press Photo 
World Press Photo, the preeminent international photography competition that features the best of photojournalism worldwide, will bring its annual exhibition to Lagos to be showcased alongside the festival. LagosPhoto has signed a three-year contract with the World Press Photo Exhibition.

See also
Addis Foto Fest
African Photography Encounters
Art biennials in Africa

References

External links 
 
 Interview with creative director with GUP

Annual events in Lagos
Art festivals in Lagos
21st century in Lagos
Photography festivals
Recurring events established in 2010
2010 establishments in Nigeria
Arts festivals in Nigeria
Art exhibitions in Nigeria
Photography in Africa